Yukon Jack is a Canadian honey based liqueur, made from Canadian Whisky and honey, advertised as “The Black Sheep of Canadian Liquors”. The alcoholic beverage is named after the pioneer Leroy Napoleon 'Jack' McQuesten. It is a 50% alcohol by volume, or 100 proof liqueur. The origin of the liqueur is unknown, but it was advertised in Maryland in the United States as early as 1946, later imported by Heublein Inc in the 1970s. It is now produced in Valleyfield, Quebec and owned by the Sazerac Company. Yukon Jack was selected as the regimental liqueur used for special occasions and commemorations for the South Alberta Light Horse and the 19th Alberta Dragoons.

Yukon Jack 
Yukon Jack is known as “The Black Sheep of Canadian Liquors” referring to the idiom, “The Black Sheep” meaning that Yukon Jack is an odd and unique form of Canadian whisky. It is a 50% alcohol by volume (100 proof) Canadian whisky and honey-based liqueur blend named after Leroy Napoleon ‘Jack’ McQuesten. As legislated by the Canadian government, there are stringent regulations as to what can be called Canadian whisky, as to maintain the reputation of a high quality product. Canadian whisky shall  “be a potable alcoholic distillate, or a mixture of potable alcoholic distillates, obtained from a mash of cereal grain or cereal grain products, be aged in small wood for not less than three years, possess the aroma, taste and character generally attributed to Canadian whisky, be mashed, distilled and aged in Canada, and contain not less than 40 per cent alcohol by volume”. Canadian whisky can contain flavouring.

Recent History 
Yukon Jack was first recorded when it was imported into the United States by Heublein Inc. Heublein was responsible for the advertising of Yukon Jack and its popularisation in the United States. The brand was later taken over by Diageo plc., a British alcohol company. In 2018, Diageo sold Yukon Jack along with 18 other alcohol brands to the Sazerac Company for $550 million. It is now manufactured in Valleyfield, Quebec. Yukon Jack was also selected as the Regimental liqueur of the South Alberta Light Horse. It is used as the liqueur in official regimental toasts. It commemorates the stationing in Whitehorse, Yukon in the 1950s of the C Squadron of the 19th Alberta Dragoons, as a part of the 19th Alberta Armoured Car Regiment.

Cocktails 
Yukon Jack is a whisky blended with honey, described as a "very strong and very sweet drink with fruity undertones.". It can be consumed as is, with ice, or as an ingredient in cocktails.

References

Bibliography 

Drinks Mixer. (2020). Yukon Jack ® Canadian Whisky. Retrieved from http://www.drinksmixer.com/desc552.html

Government of Canada. (2020). Food and Drug Regulations (C.R.C., c. 870). Canadian Whisky, Canadian Rye Whisky or Rye Whisky. Retrieved from https://laws-lois.justice.gc.ca/eng/regulations/C.R.C.,_c._870/section-B.02.020.html
Alcohol in Yukon
Canadian whisky
Honey liqueurs and spirits
Canadian alcoholic drinks
Canadian drinks
Canadian cuisine
Cuisine of Yukon